DANGERDOOM was a hip hop project consisting of Danger Mouse and MF DOOM. Their first album, The Mouse and the Mask, was released in 2005, and followed by the Occult Hymn EP in 2006.

Background
Danger Mouse and MF DOOM had previously collaborated on "Social Distortion" from Prince Po's The Slickness, Danger Mouse's remix of Zero 7's "Somersault", and the track "November Has Come" from Gorillaz' second studio album, Demon Days.

MF DOOM had stated that he hoped there would be a second Danger Doom album in which he would "rap from the perspective of the cartoons and in their voices, rather than simply create stories around them". Danger Mouse was also slated to reunite with MF DOOM in 2008, though ultimately no reunion projects occurred before MF DOOM's death in 2010.

Much of Danger Doom's music has been filled with material from and endorsed by Adult Swim, a block of animated television shows airing on cable's Cartoon Network. 

Master Shake, Frylock, Meatwad, Carl Brutananadilewski, Ignignokt, and Err from the Adult Swim television show Aqua Teen Hunger Force all make appearances on The Mouse and the Mask. References to other Adult Swim shows are found in the song "El Chupa Nibre", in which the voices of Brak (from Space Ghost Coast to Coast and The Brak Show) and Lois Griffin (from Family Guy) are heard. Both the song's title and its lines "Chew an MC like El Chupa Nibre/Digest a group and sell the poop on eBay" reference the show Futurama. Two songs, "Perfect Hair" and "A.T.H.F.",  are direct references on the shows from which they derive their names, "Perfect Hair Forever" and "Aqua Teen Hunger Force".  The song Basket Case also has Harvey Birdman, Mentok the Mind taker, and other characters in the show Harvey Birdman Attorney at Law, another show on Adult Swim. The song "Sofa King" is also an Aqua Teen Hunger Force reference.  It features the Aqua Teen Hunger Force cast and BillyWitchDoctor.com from the episode "Video Ouija." Danger Doom's music has also been played on Adult Swim; one of these songs is "Space Ho's".

Danger Doom was awarded Best Hip-Hop album of the year by PLUG Independent Music Awards for their album, The Mouse and the Mask.

In 2017 DOOM’s Metalface Records reissued The Mouse and the Mask with the previously unreleased track, Mad Nice, featuring Black Thought of The Roots.

DOOM would later posthumously appear on Danger Mouse's track "Belize" off his 2022 album Cheat Codes.

Discography

Albums

EPs

Singles

References

External links
Epitaph (U.S. Label site)
Lex Records (non-US Label site)
Waxploitation (Waxploitation)

American musical duos
East Coast hip hop groups
Hip hop duos
Musical groups from New York (state)